John Carpenter Turner (12 November 1867 – 9 February 1952) was Archdeacon of Basingstoke from 1927 until 1947.

Turner was educated at Cavendish College, Cambridge; and ordained Deacon in 1890, and Priest in 1891. After a curacy in Ryde he was Vicar of Whitchurch from 1899 to 1910; and Rector of Overton from 1910 to 1934.

In 1892 he married Elsie Maud Hewitt: they had three children, one of whom was killed during the First World War.

Notes

1867 births
Alumni of Cavendish College, Cambridge
Archdeacons of Basingstoke
1952 deaths
People from Overton, Hampshire